Anthony Preston is an American, Grammy-nominated record producer, songwriter and music executive. He frequently works with will.i.am.

Early life
Preston was born and raised in Texarkana, Texas, to a teacher mother and minister father and has two brothers. In addition to singing, he has played various instruments, including piano, oboe, saxophone, drums and bassoon.

Career
Early in his career, Preston moved to Atlanta, Georgia, and began working with various producers including Dallas Austin and Anthony Dent. Unsatisfied with the progress of his career, he considered quitting, until he met and began working and touring around the world with Chris Willis, and then David Guetta soon after. Preston co-wrote "Night of Your Life", Guetta's 2011 single featuring Jennifer Hudson, which peaked at #81 on the Billboard Hot 100.

In 2012, Preston was introduced to will.i.am, and they began to collaborate regularly, with Preston becoming creative liaison for will.i.am music group. In addition to Willis, Guetta and will.i.am, Preston has produced and written for Nicole Scherzinger, Jennifer Hudson, Afrojack, Pitbull, Havana Brown, Carly Rae Jepsen and Britney Spears.

Preston is the associate executive producer on Spears' eighth studio album, Britney Jean (2013), and is credited as a writer or producer on eleven tracks. He began working on the album in the beginning of 2013. "Work Bitch", which Preston co-wrote and co-produced, was released as the album’s lead single on September 17, 2013, and peaked at #12 on the Billboard Hot 100.

Discography

Production discography

Artist discography
 "Go Where the Love Is" (with Pedro Cazanova) (2012)

References

External links
 Anthony Preston on Twitter

African-American record producers
American hip hop record producers
American electronic musicians
American music industry executives
Living people
Musicians from Atlanta
People from Texarkana, Texas
Songwriters from Georgia (U.S. state)
Songwriters from Texas
Record producers from Texas
Year of birth missing (living people)
21st-century African-American people